The Rural Municipality of Alexander is a rural municipality in the Eastman Region of Manitoba, Canada. The town of Powerview-Pine Falls lies adjacent to the municipality, as does the Sagkeeng First Nation Indian reserve.

The municipality contains all of Manitoba's Belair Provincial Forest in its westernmost part, plus the northern half of Brightstone Sand Hills Provincial Forest in its central part.

History 
It was first incorporated as a Local Government District in 1945 and received its present status as a rural municipality on 1 January 1997. The RM had been under a boil water advisory since April 18, 2006, until a $5-million water treatment plant had been installed in September 2019.

Communities

Demographics 

References

External links 

 Official website
 Map of Alexander R.M. at Statcan
 Manitoba Historical Society - Rural Municipality of Alexander

Manitoba communities with majority francophone populations
Alexander